HIO may refer to:
 Hillsboro Airport, in Washington County, Oregon, United States
 Hypoiodous acid, an oxidising agent
 Hybrid input-output algorithm, in coherent diffraction imaging
 Oslo University College, the largest state university college in Norway
 Østfold University College, a further and higher education institution in south-eastern Norway
 Tsoa language, spoken in Botswana and Zimbabwe